Ayrat Ilgizarovich Mardeev (born 1 January 1987) is a Russian rally raid truck driver. He won his first Dakar Rally title in 2015 driving a Kamaz.

Maardeev was born in Naberezhnye Chelny. His father was Ilgizar Mardeev, also a rally raid driver, who died in a quad bike accident on 24 August 2014.

Dakar Rally results

Winner
Dakar Rally: 2015
Silk Way Rally: 2012, 2016
Siberian Highway: 2011, 2012
Russian Championship: 2013
Kagan's Gold: 2014
Great Steppe – Don: 2017

Awards
2011: Letter of gratitude by Prime Minister of Tatarstan
2013: Medal "For Valorous Labour"
2015: "Merited Machinist of Tatarstan"
2017: "Merited Transport Worker of Tatarstan"

References

External links
Profile on Team Kamaz Master

1987 births
Living people
People from Naberezhnye Chelny
Off-road racing drivers
Dakar Rally drivers
Dakar Rally winning drivers
Rally raid truck drivers
Russian rally drivers
Sportspeople from Tatarstan